Viola Kisses Everybody (Viola bacia tutti) is a 1998 Italian comedy film directed by Giovanni Veronesi.

Leonardo Pieraccioni makes a cameo role in the film as a tourist who asks Massimo Ceccherini information about a beach.

Plot
Three friends: Max (Massimo Ceccherini), Samuele (Valerio Mastandrea) and Nicola (Rocco Papaleo) go on holiday in their caravan. During the trip, Viola (Asia Argento), who has just robbed a bank, accosts the campers and takes them hostage. Initially the three are frightened, but gradually gain confidence with the girl and they become friends. Finally they decide to help her dispose of the priceless coins from the robbery.

Cast
Asia Argento: Viola
Valerio Mastandrea: Samuele
Rocco Papaleo: Nicola 'Swing'
Massimo Ceccherini: Max
Enzo Robutti: Giotto
Daria Nicolodi: Sibilla
Franco Califano: Father of Samuele
Daniela Poggi: Amanda 
Leonardo Pieraccioni: Tourist

External links
 

1998 films
Films set in Tuscany
Films directed by Giovanni Veronesi
Italian comedy films
Italian adventure films
Films about vacationing
1990s crime comedy films
1998 comedy films
1990s Italian-language films
1990s Italian films